Bertha Fanning Taylor (July 30, 1883 – July 3, 1980) was an American painter. Her work was part of the painting event in the art competition at the 1936 Summer Olympics.

References

1883 births
1980 deaths
20th-century American painters
American women painters
Olympic competitors in art competitions
People from New York City
20th-century American women artists